I and the Village is an oil on canvas painting by the Belarusian-French artist Marc Chagall created in 1911. It is exhibited at the Museum of Modern Art, New York.

The work is Cubist in construction and contains many soft, dreamlike images overlapping one another in a continuous space. In the foreground, a cap-wearing green-faced man stares at a goat or sheep with the image of a smaller goat being milked on its cheek. In the foreground is a glowing tree held in the man's dark hand. The background features a collection of houses next to an Orthodox church, and an upside-down female violinist in front of a black-clothed man holding a scythe. Note that the green-faced man wears a necklace with St. Andrew's cross. As the title suggests, I and the Village is influenced by memories of the artist's place of birth and his relationship to it.

The significance of the painting lies in its seamless integration of various elements of Eastern European folktales and culture, both Belarusian and Yiddish. Its clearly defined semiotic elements (e.g. The Tree of Life) and daringly whimsical style were at the time considered groundbreaking. Its frenetic, fanciful style is credited to Chagall's childhood memories becoming, in the words of scholar H.W. Janson, a "cubist fairy tale" reshaped by his imagination, without regard to natural color, size or even the laws of gravity.

See also
List of artworks by Marc Chagall

References

Sources
Charlotte Douglas, Jeannene M. Przyblyski, I and the village: early works, Jewish Community Museum, 1987
Rosenblum, Robert. Cubism and Twentieth-Century Art. New York: Harry N. Abrams, 1966.

1911 paintings
Paintings by Marc Chagall
Paintings in the collection of the Museum of Modern Art (New York City)
Goats in art
Musical instruments in art